Cicurina bryantae is a species of true spider in the family Hahniidae. It is found in the United States.

References

Hahniidae
Articles created by Qbugbot
Spiders described in 1936